Adam Lee Miller is one half of the band ADULT. and an owner of Ersatz Audio with his wife Nicola Kuperus. He was formerly in Le Car, which disbanded in 1997. He lives in Detroit.

References

Musicians from Detroit
Living people
Year of birth missing (living people)
Place of birth missing (living people)
21st-century American male musicians